Kent Kessinger is an American retired college football coach. He was the head football coach at Ottawa University in Ottawa, Kansas, from 2004 to 2021, compiling a record of 108–85.

Playing career
Kessinger is a graduate of Bethany College in Lindsborg, Kansas, where he played offensive line under his father, Ted Kessinger.

Coaching career
Part of Kessinger's coaching style was to encourage athletes to participate in more than one sport. "It breaks up the year, it gives them something to compete with when they're in the offseason, and if they really love to play it, then we encourage them to keep on doing it," he said

Head coaching record

References

Year of birth missing (living people)
Living people
American football offensive linemen
Augustana (South Dakota) Vikings football coaches
Bethany Swedes football players
Ottawa Braves football coaches